Gladiator is a series of historical fiction novels for young adults by Simon Scarrow set in ancient Rome in the years before the fall of the Roman Republic. The books tell the story of Marcus Cornelius Primus, a young gladiator and street fighter caught up in the dramatic events unfolding as Rome descends into civil war and chaos.

Titles in series
Gladiator: Fight for Freedom
Gladiator: Street Fighter
Gladiator: Son of Spartacus
Gladiator: Vengeance

 
Novels by Simon Scarrow
Historical novels by series
Novels set in ancient Rome